Muhammad Sean Ricardo Gelael (born 1 November 1996) is an Indonesian racing driver currently competing with Team WRT in the FIA World Endurance Championship.

He competed in GP2 Series from 2015 to 2016, and the FIA Formula 2 Championship from 2017 to 2020, racing for DAMS in his final season.

Early career

Karting 
In 2011, he competed in the Asian Karting Open Championship – Formula 125 Senior Open 2011, finishing third in the overall standings.

Lower formulae 
Gelael began his car racing career in his native continent, competing in the Formula Pilota China in 2012. He finished his debut season fourth in the overall standings and second in the "Best Asian Trophy" standings. He raced for the BVM team in the last round of the 2012 Formula Abarth season at Monza.

FIA European Formula 3 Championship

2013 
In 2013, Gelael participated in the 2013 FIA European Formula 3 Championship season, joining the Double R Racing team. During the same year, the Indonesian driver made an appearance in the Masters of Formula 3, although he was forced to retire from the race.

2014 

In 2014, Gelael signed with Carlin for the 2014 season. On 10 May 2014, he scored his first ever point in the championship, finishing 10th and therefore scoring one point in the Pau Grand Prix. He finished the season in 18th position with 25 points.

British Formula 3 Championship 
Gelael competed in the 2013 British Formula 3 International Series alongside Antonio Giovinazzi, driving for Double R Racing. He claimed his first podium in at Silverstone by finishing 3rd in the second race. He finished eight in the final overall standings.

Formula Renault 3.5 Series 
On 20 January 2015, it was announced that Gelael will compete in the 2015 Formula Renault 3.5 Series with Carlin partnering with Tom Dillmann. He finished 19th in the overall standings.

GP2 Series/FIA Formula 2 Championship

2015 
Gelael made his GP2 Series debut with Carlin Motorsport in the Hungarian Grand Prix in the 2015 season. He finished 18th in the feature race and 20th in the sprint race.

2016 

In 2016, Gelael competed full-time in the GP2 Series with Campos Racing, partnering Mitch Evans. At Catalunya, he finished 19th in the feature race having started from 22nd on the grid. He scored his first podium at the Red Bull Ring, where he finished second behind his teammate Evans, who won the race.

2017 

With the championship rebranded to the FIA Formula 2 Championship, Gelael moved to the Pertamina Arden team for the 2017 season, joining Norman Nato. Gelael lost the team battle, finishing in points-paying positions just in four races.

2018 

Gelael raced for Prema Racing in the 2018 season, joining Dutch driver Nyck de Vries. In the Monaco Grand Prix, he scored his only podium for the season, finishing second in the feature race. He failed to score points for the rest of the season following his podium finish. He placed 15th with 29 points in the overall standings.

2019 

For the 2019 season, Gelael remained with Prema, partnered by 2018 FIA Formula 3 European Championship winner Mick Schumacher. He lost the team battle, finishing in 17th position in the drivers' standings by scoring points in just five races.

2020 
Gelael left Prema to join reigning FIA Formula 2 teams' champion DAMS for the 2020 season, replacing Sérgio Sette Câmara. He was joined by two-time Macau Grand Prix winner and Williams Driver Academy member Dan Ticktum. He scored points in both races of the second round at the Red Bull Ring, finishing tenth and seventh. He broke a vertebra from an impact with a kerb during the Barcelona feature race, and was unable to start the sprint race. He was replaced at DAMS by Red Bull Junior Team driver Jüri Vips for the next four rounds. At the time of his injury he had scored three points, compared to 61 points for teammate Ticktum.

FIA Formula 2 departure 
Due to a string of accidents and technical failures, followed by Gelael's seldom points-scoring performances in FIA Formula 2 Championship that contributed to poor seasons, Gelael's father Ricardo Gelael announced that his son will no longer continue racing in Formula 2 after the 2020 season.

Formula One 

Gelael had his first experience of Formula One machinery, driving the Toro Rosso STR12 at the in-season test after the 2017 Bahrain Grand Prix, completing 78 laps. He continued to drive for Toro Rosso in a testing capacity throughout the  season, including tests at the Hungaroring and Yas Marina Circuit as well as Friday practice appearances in Singapore, Malaysia, the United States and Mexico. In 2019, Gelael again took part in the post-season tyre test for Toro Rosso in Abu Dhabi.

Sportscar career

2016: Debut success 
Gelael stepped into the Asian Le Mans Series during the second half of 2015–16 season to gather his first experience in endurance racing. Competing for Jagonya Ayam with Eurasia alongside Antonio Giovinazzi, the pair won both races they drove in and finished third in the standings.

During the same year, he would also make his FIA World Endurance Championship debut with Extreme Speed Motorsports, competing in the last three rounds of the season.

2021: Title assaults 
Following the conclusion to his time in Formula 2, Gelael returned to the ALMS for the entirety of the 2021 campaign, driving for Jota Sport alongside Formula E drivers Stoffel Vandoorne and Tom Blomqvist in the LMP2 category. He finished second and fifth in Dubai and won both races in Abu Dhabi, which placed him second in the standings.

The Indonesian's main focus for 2021 would lie in the World Endurance Championship, where he once again partnered Vandoorne and Blomqvist at Jota Sport. Following a pair of podiums at the beginning of the season, a strong performance from the team would see the trio finish second in class at the 24 Hours of Le Mans. Despite rounding off the season with two further appearances on the rostrum, Gelael and his teammates would miss out on the title to Team WRT, who had managed to win the final three races, which left Jota second in the LMP2 results. Following the end of the season, Gelael described the season as having been "really good", whilst equally ruing the team's missed opportunities to win races.

He would make a guest appearance during the 4 Hours of Monza with Jota, finishing third alongside Malaysian driver Jazeman Jaafar.

2022: Adding victories 
In 2022 Gelael continued to race in the World Endurance Championship, switching teams to previous year's champions WRT to drive alongside Robin Frijns and René Rast. After starting the season with a strong second place at a rain-shortened race in Sebring, the Indonesian took his maiden win in the category at the 6 Hours of Spa-Francorchamps. Dramatic scenes would occur at the 24 Hours of Le Mans, as, having started from pole due to an impressive lap from Frijns, the team was forced to retire with hours to go after the Dutchman had made an error and collided with the barriers. The outfit was set back further in Monza, where a twelfth place following a radiator issue made them miss out on points for the second race in a row. At the penultimate race in Fuji, Gelael, Frijns and substitute teammate Laurens Vanthoor managed to win the race, having held off advances from the Nr. 38 Jota car in the dying embers of the event. Another victory at the 8 Hours of Bahrain would not be enough to take the title, as the team lost out to Jota by 21 points.

2023: GT3 debut 
At the start of 2023, Gelael teamed up with Valentino Rossi and three other drivers to compete in the Dubai 24 Hour event, driving a BMW M4 GT3 for WRT. The lineup experienced a positive weekend, completing a double-podium for the team by finishing third.

For a third year running, the World Endurance Championship would be the main destination for the Indonesian, who, along with Robin Frijns, remained at Team WRT to be partnered by Ferdinand Habsburg.

Personal life
Gelael is the son of the owner of Kentucky Fried Chicken's Indonesian franchise and former rally driver Ricardo Gelael, and actress Rini S Bono. He is the cousin of Indonesian tennis player Justin Barki. His late grandfather Dick Gelael is the founder of Gelael Supermarket and Multi Food Indonesia.

Karting record

Karting career summary

Racing record

Racing career summary 

† As Gelael was a guest driver, he was ineligible for points.

Complete Formula Pilota China results 
(key) (Races in bold indicate pole position) (Races in italics indicate fastest lap)

Complete British Formula 3 International Series results 
(key) (Races in bold indicate pole position) (Races in italics indicate fastest lap)

† As Gelael was a guest driver, he was ineligible for points.

Complete FIA Formula 3 European Championship results 
(key) (Races in bold indicate pole position) (Races in italics indicate fastest lap)

† Driver did not finish the race, but was classified as he completed over 90% of the race distance.

Complete Formula Renault 3.5 Series results 
(key) (Races in bold indicate pole position) (Races in italics indicate fastest lap)

Complete GP2 Series results 
(key) (Races in bold indicate pole position) (Races in italics indicate fastest lap)

Complete European Le Mans Series results 

† As Gelael was a guest driver, he was ineligible to score points.

Complete FIA World Endurance Championship results 

* Season still in progress.

Complete FIA Formula 2 Championship results 
(key) (Races in bold indicate pole position) (Races in italics indicate points for the fastest lap of top ten finishers)

Complete Formula One participations 
(key) (Races in bold indicate pole position; races in italics indicates fastest lap)

Complete Asian Le Mans Series results

Complete 24 Hours of Le Mans results

Complete 24H GT Series results

References

External links 

 
 
 Sean GP
 Sean Gelael Kian Mendekat ke F1

1996 births
Living people
Sportspeople from Jakarta
Indonesian people of Chinese descent
Indonesian Muslims
Indonesian racing drivers
Indonesian socialites
Formula Masters China drivers
Formula Abarth drivers
FIA Formula 3 European Championship drivers
British Formula Three Championship drivers
World Series Formula V8 3.5 drivers
GP2 Series drivers
Asian Le Mans Series drivers
FIA Formula 2 Championship drivers
FIA World Endurance Championship drivers
European Le Mans Series drivers
24 Hours of Le Mans drivers
Eurasia Motorsport drivers
Double R Racing drivers
Carlin racing drivers
Campos Racing drivers
Extreme Speed Motorsports drivers
Arden International drivers
Prema Powerteam drivers
DAMS drivers
Jota Sport drivers
W Racing Team drivers
BVM Racing drivers
SMP Racing drivers
Karting World Championship drivers
24H Series drivers